The Price of Love (French:  Interdit de séjour) is a 1955 French crime drama film directed by Maurice de Canonge and starring Claude Laydu, Joëlle Bernard and Pierre Destailles. The film's sets were designed by the art director Maurice Colasson.

Cast
 Claude Laydu as Pierre Ménard
 Joëlle Bernard as Suzy
 Pierre Destailles as Jojo
 Renaud Mary as Fernando
 Daniel Cauchy as 	Paulo
 Liliane Bert as 	Monique
 Henri Crémieux as 	Le juge d'instruction
 Robert Dalban as 	L'inspecteur Chennier
 Arlette Merry as 	Raymonde
 Michel Piccoli as Georges
 Clara Tambour as L'auditrice	
 Robert Le Béal as L'avocat de Pierre
 Marcel Raine as 	L'avocat général
 Paul Frankeur as 	Commissaire Bernard
 Yôko Tani as Une entraîneuse

References

Bibliography
 Burnett, Colin. The Invention of Robert Bresson: The Auteur and His Market. Indiana University Press, 2016.

External links 
 

1955 films
1955 crime films
French crime films
1950s French-language films
Films directed by Maurice de Canonge
1950s French films
Films set in Paris

fr:Interdit de séjour